John Francis Blackwood, 11th Baron Dufferin and Claneboye (born 18 October 1944) is an Australian architect and a peer in the peerage of Ireland.

The son of Francis Blackwood, 10th Baron Dufferin and Claneboye, by his marriage to Margaret Kirkpatrick, he was educated at Barker College, Hornsby, New South Wales, and the University of New South Wales, graduating as a Bachelor of Architecture.

In 1971 Blackwood married Annette Kay Greenhill, a daughter of Harold Greenhill. They have two children, Freya Jodie (born 1975) and Francis Senden Blackwood (born 1979), heir apparent to the peerage.

Blackwood went into private practice as an architect in Orange, New South Wales, and by 1984 was listed as ARAIA. In 1991 he succeeded his father as 11th Baron Dufferin and Clandeboye of Ballyleidy and Killyleagh, County Down, and also as 12th Baronet of Ballyleidy, but did not use either title professionally.

In 2003 Dufferin was still living in Orange, New South Wales.

Arms

The arms of the head of the family are blazoned Azure a Fess Or in chief a Crescent Argent between two Mullets of the second and in base a Mascle of the third; for supporters Dexter a Lion Gules gorged with a Tressure flory counterflory Or;  Sinister an Heraldic Tiger Ermine gorged with a like Tressure Gules. The crest is On a Cap of Maintenance Gules turned up Ermine a Crescent Argent out of the Coronet of a Baron. The motto 
is “Per Vias Rectas”, meaning “By straight ways”.

Notes

Blackwood, John Francis
20th-century Australian architects
21st-century Australian architects
Australian peers
Dufferin and Claneboye, John Francis Blackwood, 11th Baron
John Francis
Clandeboye
New South Wales architects
People educated at Barker College
University of New South Wales alumni
Living people